Ephysteris subdiminutella is a moth of the family Gelechiidae. It is a widely distributed species, it is known from northern and southern Africa, from Egypt to South Africa, Australia, Palestine, India, Pakistan and  Afghanistan.  It is also found in the Galápagos Islands.

Known host plants of the larvae of this species include Balanitaceae (Balanites aegyptiaca), 
Zygophyllaceae (Zygophyllum album) and Rhamnaceae (Zizyphus sp.).

References

External links
Lebarcoding.org: Ephystreris subdiminutella
Boldsystems.org: Pictures of Ephystreris subdiminutella

Ephysteris
Lepidoptera of Namibia
Lepidoptera of Ethiopia
Moths of Réunion
Moths of Europe
Moths of Africa